Itombwe may refer to:
 Itombwe Mountains, also known as the Itombwe Plateau, a plateau in South Kivu, Democratic Republic of the Congo, overlooking the Ruzizi plain
 Itombwe Nature Reserve, a nature reserve on the Itombwe Mountains
 Itombwe flycatcher, a bird also known as Chapin's flycatcher, a different species
 Itombwe Massif clawed frog, also known as Xenopus itombwensis
 Itombwe nightjar, a bird also known as Prigogine's nightjar